Nelson's Island ( or ) is an island located in Abū Qīr Bay, off the coast of Alexandria, Egypt. It is a local site for picnics and recreation, and is the location of a group of British graves dating from the Napoleonic Wars. It was named after Horatio Nelson, the famous British admiral.

In 2000, Italian archaeologist Dr Paolo Gallo discovered a series of graves on the island. Further digging and research (in collaboration with British historian Nick Slope) determined that the graves dated from the 1798 Battle of the Nile, and another land battle in 1801. The remains of British officers, sailors, marines, women, and children were uncovered.

On 18 April 2005 the remains of thirty Royal Navy sailors and officers recovered from the island were buried at Chatby Commonwealth War Cemetery in Alexandria. Only one body, that of Master and Commander James Russell, was positively identified.

Resources
 Smith, Tannalee. "30 Members of British Fleet Reburied". Associated Press, April 18, 2005.
 "Women in Nelson's Navy" - BBC
 "Reburial for Nelson's comrades" - BBC
 Women Fought With Nelson's Heroes of the Nile, Archaeologists Discover

Islands of Egypt
Mediterranean islands